The  is a kei car manufactured by the Japanese carmaker Daihatsu. It was introduced at the 2003 Tokyo Motor Show as a vehicle based on the Move's "tall" body style, and followed by the Tanto Custom in July 2005.

The name "Tanto" is derived from Italian word for "so much" or "a lot".



First generation (L350; 2003) 

The first-generation Tanto went on sale on 27 November 2003. The grade levels consisted of L, X and X Limited for naturally aspirated engine option, and R and RS for turbocharged engine option.

The Tanto Custom was added in July 2005, which grade levels consisted of L and X for naturally aspirated engine option, and RS for turbocharged engine option.

Tanto FCHV 
The Tanto FCHV (Fuel Cell Hybrid Vehicle) was introduced at the 2005 Tokyo Motor Show. Based on the Tanto Custom, the prototype vehicle adds a hydrogen tank and electric motors.

Second generation (L375; 2007) 

The second-generation Tanto went on sale on 17 December 2007. Among the main features of this generation is an ordinary side-hinged rear door on the right and a sliding door without an intermediate pillar on the left.

Third generation (LA600; 2013) 

The third-generation Tanto went on sale on 3 October 2013. This generation used the sliding door on both sides. The car is also sold by Subaru as the  since December 2016 through an OEM agreement.

Fourth generation (LA650; 2019) 

The fourth-generation Tanto went on sale in Japan on 9 July 2019, followed by the second-generation Chiffon on 16 July. It is built on the Daihatsu New Global Architecture (DNGA) platform. The regular model is offered in L, X and X Turbo grade levels, while the Custom model is offered in L, X and RS grade levels. The turbocharged engine option is only available in X Turbo and RS grades.

By one month since its launch, the fourth-generation Tanto had been ordered for approximately 37,000 units, nearly three times the monthly sales target of 12,500 units.

The Tanto Custom received a facelift on 3 October 2022. At the same time, the crossover-styled variant called Tanto FunCross was also added to the lineup. The facelifted Chiffon later followed on 13 October.

References

External links 

  (Tanto)
  (Tanto FunCross)
  (Chiffon)

Tanto
Cars introduced in 2003
2010s cars
2020s cars
Microvans
Front-wheel-drive vehicles
All-wheel-drive vehicles
Vehicles with CVT transmission